Plot on the Stage (Spanish:Intriga en el escenario) is a 1953 Spanish crime film directed by Feliciano Catalán.

Cast
 Gabriel Alcover as Policía 2º  
 Florinda Chico 
 Helena Cortesina as Olga  
 Elva de Bethancourt as Doncella de servicio  
 Victoria del Castillo 
 Encarna Fuentes as Mary  
 Margarete Genske as Tina Reyes  
 José Gomís as Daniel  
 Enrique Guitart as Olmedo  
 Manuel Guitián as Trombonista  
 Casimiro Hurtado as Gitano  
 José Isbert as Portero  
 Víctor M. Morales as Children
 Manolo Morán as Paco  
 Joaquín Palomares 
 Gustavo Re as Óscar  
 Carmen Rey 
 Rosario Royo as Señora del empresario  
 Fernando Sancho as Policía 1º  
 José Toledano 
 Juan Vázquez as Empresario

References

Bibliography 
 Bentley, Bernard. A Companion to Spanish Cinema. Boydell & Brewer 2008.

External links 
 

1953 crime films
Spanish crime films
1953 films
1950s Spanish-language films
1950s Spanish films